Ovčáry is name of several locations in the Czech Republic:
 Ovčáry (Kolín District)
 Ovčáry (Mělník District)